Patriots is a play by Peter Morgan. The play follows billionaire businessman Boris Berezovsky and his role in the president’s inner circle to public enemy number one.

Productions 
Patriots had its premier at the Almeida Theatre in London on 12 July 2022, following previews from 2 July. It played a limited run to 20 August. The cast featured Tom Hollander, Will Keen, Yolanda Kettle, Luke Thallon, Matt Concannon, Stephen Fewell, Ronald Guttman, Aoife Hinds, Sean Kingsley, Paul Kynman, Jessica Temple and Jamael Westman. The production will transfer to the West End, playing at the Noel Coward Theatre from 26 May 2023 to 19 August.

Awards

References 

2022 plays